Andres De Los Reyes (born March 18, 1978) is a professor of psychology at University of Maryland College Park.  He is also the director of the Comprehensive Assessment and Intervention Program Laboratory, editor-in-chief of the Journal of Clinical Child & Adolescent Psychology, the official journal of the Society of Clinical Child and Adolescent Psychology, Division 53 of the American Psychological Association. He also founded and remains a program chair of the JCCAP Future Directions Forum, an annual conference affiliated with the journal. De Los Reyes has co-authored over 100 peer-reviewed scientific articles and book chapters, and recently completed a term as a Fulbright Canada Research Chair in mental health at the University of Regina. He is known for his work on psychological assessment, particularly understanding the potential sources and implications of apparent disagreement between different people's perceptions of youth emotion and behavior, as often happens when parents, teachers, and youths are asked separately about the youth. He also works extensively on issues surrounding mentorship and skills-based approaches to early career development. He is the author of The Early Career Researcher's Toolbox: A career development guide that includes strategies for working with mentors, publishing peer-reviewed articles, and interviewing for faculty positions. Career development coaching and activities are also a prominent feature of the Future Direction Forum.

Education and degrees
De Los Reyes completed triple majors (B.A. in psychology and political science and B.S. in criminal justice) at Florida International University.  He attended Yale University where he received his M.S., M. Phil and Ph.D. in clinical psychology.  He completed his clinical psychology internship at the Department of Psychology, Institute for Juvenile Research at University of Illinois at Chicago.

Positions and roles

Professor of Psychology, University of Maryland at College Park

2020–2021, Fulbright Canada Research Chair in Mental Health

Director, Comprehensive Assessment and Intervention Program

Editor, Journal of Clinical Child and Adolescent Psychology

Program Chair, Future Directions Forum

Research
De Los Reyes’ research broadly focuses on the most common outcomes of youth mental health assessments, more specifically that informants typically involved in these assessments (e.g., parents, teachers, youth themselves) provide discrepant reports about youth mental health, even when they complete the same measures or respond to the same items (i.e., informant discrepancies). De Los Reyes' work on these informant discrepancies covers assessments of domains as diverse as autism, social anxiety, disruptive behavior, peer relations, family functioning, depression, and conduct problems

De Los Reyes is interested in understanding what informant discrepancies tell us about youth undergoing evaluation. For instance, when a parent reports high levels of a symptom in their child that a teacher does not corroborate in their report, might such a discrepancy serve as a signal that the youth has mental health needs which appear at home to a greater extent than they do at school? Addressing this question is important because there are no clear guidelines in the field for what to make of this information, and De Los Reyes seeks to mitigate uncertainties in research and clinical service decision-making by understanding factors that reliably predict the occurrence of these discrepancies.

De Los Reyes takes a conceptually grounded and team scholarship approach to examining how informant discrepancies in youth mental health assessments reveal meaningful clinical information regarding the contexts in which the youth display mental health concerns. De Los Reyes works across fields including cognitive science, education, human development, neuroscience, organizational behavior, medicine, and social work. His work involves research on informant discrepancies relevant to assessments conducted across developmental periods, including early childhood, adolescence, and periods of adulthood. De Los Reyes studies multiple metal health domains including social anxiety, disruptive behavior, autism, social competence, substance use, family functioning, and peer relations. De Los Reyes integrates multi-informant, psychophysiological, observational, and performance-based assessment paradigms in his work. He uses these paradigms to test questions using experimental, controlled observation, naturalistic, and quantitative review research designs. De Los Reyes' long-term goal in research is to understand informant discrepancies and the factors that shape them, and to leverage this knowledge to develop strategies that optimize decision-making in the settings in which these discrepancies occur.

Honors and awards

Selected publications
De Los Reyes has published over 100 peer-reviewed journal articles and book chapters. Below are a selection of some of his most cited work and most recent work.

De Los Reyes, A., Wang, M., Lerner, M.D., Makol, B.A., Fitzpatrick, O., & Weisz, J.R. (2022). The Operations Triad Model and youth mental health assessments: Catalyzing a paradigm shift in measurement validation. Journal of Clinical Child and Adolescent Psychology. Advance online publication. https://doi.org/10.1080/15374416.2022.2111684
De Los Reyes, A., Talbott, E., Power, T., Michel, J., Cook, C.R., Racz, S.J., & Fitzpatrick, O. (2022). The Needs-to-Goals Gap: How informant discrepancies in youth mental health assessments impact service delivery. Clinical Psychology Review, 92, 102114. https://doi.org/10.1016/j.cpr.2021.102114
De Los Reyes, A., Tyrell, F.A., Watts, A.L., & Asmundson, G.J.G. (2022). Conceptual, methodological, and measurement factors that disqualify use of measurement invariance techniques to detect informant discrepancies in youth mental health assessments. Frontiers in Psychology, 13, 931296. https://doi.org/10.3389/fpsyg.2022.931296
Charamut, N.R., Racz, S.J., Wang, Mo, & De Los Reyes, A. (2022). Integrating multi-informant reports of youth mental health: A construct validation test of Kraemer and Colleagues’ (2003) Satellite Model. Frontiers in Psychology, 13, 911629. https://doi.org/10.3389/fpsyg.2022.911629
Makol, B.A., Youngstrom, E.A., Racz, S.J., Qasmieh, N., Glenn, L.E., & De Los Reyes, A. (2020). Integrating multiple informants’ reports: How conceptual and measurement models may address long-standing problems in clinical decision-making. Clinical Psychological Science, 8(6), 953–970. https://doi.org/10.1177/2167702620924439
De Los Reyes, A., Augenstein, T. M., Wang, M., Thomas, S. A., Drabick, D. A. G., Burgers, D. E., & Rabinowitz, J. (2015). The validity of the multi-informant approach to assessing child and adolescent mental health. Psychological Bulletin, 141(4), 858–900. https://doi.org/10.1037/a0038498
De Los Reyes, A., Thomas, S. A., Goodman, K. L., & Kundey, S. M. A. (2013). Principles underlying the use of multiple informants’ reports. Annual Review of Clinical Psychology, 9, 123–149. https://doi.org/10.1146/annurev-clinpsy-050212-185617
De Los Reyes, A. (2011). Introduction to the Special Section: More Than Measurement Error: Discovering Meaning Behind Informant Discrepancies in Clinical Assessments of Children and Adolescents. Journal of Clinical Child & Adolescent Psychology, 40(1), 1–9. https://doi.org/10.1080/15374416.2011.533405
De Los Reyes, A., & Kazdin, A. E. (2005). Informant Discrepancies in the Assessment of Childhood Psychopathology: A Critical Review, Theoretical Framework, and Recommendations for Further Study. Psychological Bulletin, 131(4), 483–509. https://doi.org/10.1037/0033-2909.131.4.483

References

External links
Faculty Profile
Lab Website (CAIP Lab)

Future Directions Forum Website
Journal of Clinical Child and Adolescent Psychology

Living people
21st-century American psychologists
Mental health researchers
University System of Maryland faculty
Yale Graduate School of Arts and Sciences alumni
1978 births